Fabulla or Fabylla was a medical writer of the Roman Empire, whose work survives only as two quotations in Galen.

Identity 
Galen calls Fabulla a Libyan, but her name identifies her as Roman. She uses a Roman weight system (including the libra) to measure her ingredients, and this suggests that her work may have been written originally in Latin, and translated into Greek by Galen or a lost intermediary source. She was probably a medica ('female doctor').

Works 
Galen references two medicines from Fabulla, 'for those with disease of the spleen, dropsy, sciatica, gout', and shortly thereafter reproduces a Greek text of the recipes. Fabulla herself attributes the first of these medicines to an earlier medica, Antiochis of Tlos.

References

Sources 

 Flemming, Rebecca (2007). "Women, Writing and Medicine in the Classical World". The Classical Quarterly, 57(1): pp. 257–279.
 Parker, Holt N. (2012). "Galen and the Girls: Sources for Women Medical Writers Revisited". The Classical Quarterly, 62(1): pp. 359–386.
 Plant, Ian Michael (2004). Women Writers of Ancient Greece and Rome: An Anthology. London: Equinox Publishing Ltd. pp. 5, 139, 159, 223, 243.

2nd-century women
3rd-century women
Medical writers
Women medical writers